Jean-Pierre Cyprien (born 12 February 1969) is a former French footballer who played defender for various clubs in France and Italy.

Honours
Neuchâtel Xamax
Swiss Super League: 1996–97 runner-up

External links
 
 Jean-Pierre Cyprien at worldfootball.net 
 

1969 births
Living people
French footballers
France international footballers
Association football defenders
Ligue 1 players
Serie A players
Serie B players
Swiss Super League players
Le Havre AC players
AS Saint-Étienne players
Torino F.C. players
Stade Rennais F.C. players
Neuchâtel Xamax FCS players
U.S. Lecce players
Olympique de Marseille players
U.S. Salernitana 1919 players
F.C. Crotone players
Pau FC players
French expatriate footballers
Expatriate footballers in Italy
Expatriate footballers in Switzerland
French expatriate sportspeople in Italy
French expatriate sportspeople in Switzerland